Mike Dee (born May 20, 1958) is an American former baseball coach and outfielder. He played college baseball at the University of Wisconsin–La Crosse. He served as the head baseball coach at the UIC Flames (1999–2021). Under him, UIC reached six NCAA Tournaments. Before coming to UIC, he was an assistant at Minnesota.

Playing career
Dee was raised near Chicago before moving to Wisconsin for his senior year of high school. He played high school baseball at Benet Academy in Lisle, Illinois for three years and at Aquinas High School in La Crosse, Wisconsin for one. He attended the University of Wisconsin–La Crosse, where he played three seasons of baseball for the Indians. In 1979, Dee's senior season, the team reached the NAIA World Series.

Coaching career
Dee first coached high school baseball at Aquinas for six seasons from 1982 to 1987. The school won the Wisconsin State Title four straight times from 1984 to 1987. In 1987, Dee was named the Wisconsin State High School Coach of the Year and the Wisconsin Baseball Coaches Association Coach (WBCA) of the Year.

Minnesota
Dee's first college coaching job came at Minnesota, where he was an assistant under John Anderson from 1988 to 1998. During his tenure, the Golden Gophers reached six NCAA Tournaments and never won fewer than 30 games. Dee was named the WBCA Man of the Year in 1996.

UIC
Ahead of the 1999 season, Dee replaced Dean Refakes as the head coach at UIC.

After a losing record in 1999, UIC began the most successful stretch in program history from 2000 to 2008. In the stretch, the Flames had nine 30-win seasons and won eight Horizon League regular season titles and four Horizon League Tournaments.

UIC made its first NCAA Tournament in 2003, then reached the postseason again in 2005, 2007, and 2008. The team went 0–2 in 2003 and 2005 but won a game in both 2007 and 2008. In 2007, as the fourth seed in the Long Beach Regional, it upset top-seeded Long Beach State. In 2008, as the fourth seed in the College Station Regional, it defeated second seeded Dallas Baptist in an elimination game.  UIC extended Dee's contract after the 2008 season.

In November 2006, Dee was seriously injured in a practice accident. A player doing a bat release drill accidentally let go of a bat that flew and hit Dee in the face. His orbital, cheekbone, and nose were shattered. Doctors restored his face with major reconstructive surgery and metal implants, and he kept sight in both eyes. He was able to coach the start of the following 2007 season, though he needed a mask and dugout heaters to protect the healing bones from the cold.

Dee has won the Horizon League Coach of the Year award eight times: 1999, 2000, 2002, 2003, 2005, 2006, 2007, and 2008. During his tenure, UIC has had two league Players of the Year, three Pitchers of the Year, and seven Newcomers of the Year.

Six Flames have been taken in the MLB Draft from 1999 to 2014. Future Major Leaguer Curtis Granderson played for the program early in Dee's tenure and was one of the Flames' conference Players of the Year.  In 2014, following a $5 million donation from Granderson to rebuild the stadium, UIC's home field was renamed Les Miller Field at Curtis Granderson Stadium.

On June 15, 2021, UIC announced Mike Dee's retirement. On September 8, Dee, serving as athletic director of Aquinas High School, announced he would also serve as the head coach of the baseball team.

Head coaching record
Below is a table of Dee's yearly records as a collegiate head baseball coach.

Notes

References

External links
 February 2013 Interview at Youtube.com

Living people
1958 births
High school baseball coaches in the United States
Minnesota Golden Gophers baseball coaches
UIC Flames baseball coaches
Wisconsin–La Crosse Eagles baseball players